The Sugar Bowl is an annual American college football bowl game played in New Orleans, Louisiana. Played annually since January 1, 1935, it is tied with the Orange Bowl and Sun Bowl as the second-oldest bowl games in the country, surpassed only by the Rose Bowl Game.

The Sugar Bowl was originally played at Tulane Stadium before moving to the Superdome in 1975. When the Superdome and the rest of the city suffered damage due to both the winds from and the flooding in the aftermath of Hurricane Katrina in 2005, the Sugar Bowl was temporarily moved to the Georgia Dome in Atlanta in 2006. Since 2007, the game has been sponsored by Allstate and officially known as the Allstate Sugar Bowl. Previous sponsors include Nokia (1996–2006) and USF&G Financial Services (1988–1995).

The Sugar Bowl has had a longstanding—albeit not exclusive—relationship with the Southeastern Conference (SEC) (which once had a member institution based in New Orleans, Tulane University; another Louisiana school, Louisiana State University (LSU) in Baton Rouge, is still in the SEC today).  Indeed, the Sugar Bowl did not feature an SEC team only four times in its first 60 editions, and an SEC team played in the game in every year but one from 1950 to 1995.  The SEC's opponent varied from year to year, but prior to the advent of the Bowl Championship Series, it was often the runner-up of the Big Eight, SWC, or a major independent.

The Sugar Bowl-SEC relationship has been altered over the past twenty years due to conference realignments and the emergence of a series of coalitions and alliances intending to produce an undisputed national champion in college football, but the ties between the Sugar Bowl and the SEC have persisted and have recently been strengthened.  Since 2015, the Sugar Bowl, along with the Rose, Orange, Cotton, Peach, and Fiesta bowls, is one of the "New Year's Six" bowls in rotation for the College Football Playoff.  It hosted a playoff semifinal following the 2014, 2017, and 2020 seasons, and will next host one following the 2023 season.  In other years, it will feature the best available teams from SEC and the Big 12 conferences, an arrangement nearly identical with the relationship between the Rose Bowl and the champions of the Big Ten and Pac-12.

As a member of the Bowl Championship Series, the Sugar Bowl hosted the BCS National Championship Game twice, in 2000 and 2004, as the national championship rotated between the bowls themselves until 2006 when the national championship game became a standalone event. Since the 2014 season, the Sugar Bowl has been in the rotation of bowls—commonly referred to as the New Year's Six—that host College Football Playoff (CFP) semifinal games once every three years.

History

In 1890, Pasadena, California, held its first Tournament of Roses Parade to showcase the city's mild weather compared to the harsh winters in northern cities. As one of the organizers said: "In New York, people are buried in snow. Here, our flowers are blooming and our oranges are about to bear [fruit]. Let's hold a festival to tell the world about our paradise." In 1902, the annual festival was enhanced by adding a football game.

 
In 1926, leaders in Miami, Florida, decided to do the same with a "Fiesta of the American Tropics" that was centered around a New Year's Day football game. Although a second "Fiesta" was never held, Miami leaders later revived the idea with the "Palm Festival" (with the slogan "Have a Green Christmas in Miami"). The football game and associated festivities of the Palm Festival were soon named the "Orange Bowl."

In New Orleans, Louisiana, the idea of a New Year's Day football game was first presented in 1927 by Colonel James M. Thomson, publisher of the New Orleans Item, and Sports Editor Fred Digby. Every year thereafter, Digby repeated calls for action, and even came up with the name "Sugar Bowl" for his proposed football game.

By 1935, enough support had been garnered for the first Sugar Bowl. The game was played in Tulane Stadium, which had been built in 1926 on Tulane University's campus (before 1871, Tulane's campus was Paul Foucher's plantation, where Foucher's father-in-law, Etienne de Bore, had first granulated sugar from cane syrup). Warren V. Miller, the first president of the New Orleans Mid-Winter Sports Association, guided the Sugar Bowl through its difficult formative years of 1934 and 1935.  An unusual 2–0 score marked the 1942 Sugar Bowl, in which the sole scoring play was a safety.

In January 1956, Bobby Grier became the first black player to participate in the Sugar Bowl. He is also regarded as the first black player to compete at a bowl game in the Deep South, though others such as Wallace Triplett had played in games like the 1948 Cotton Bowl in Dallas. Grier's team, the Pittsburgh Panthers, was set to play against the Georgia Tech Yellow Jackets. However, Georgia's Governor Marvin Griffin beseeched Georgia Tech to not participate in this racially integrated game. Griffin was widely criticized by news media leading up to the game, and protests were held at his mansion by Georgia Tech students. Despite the governor's objections, Georgia Tech's president Blake R. Van Leer upheld the contract after he threatened to resign and the board of regents voted in his favor to compete in the bowl. In the game's first quarter, a pass interference call against Grier ultimately resulted in Yellow Jackets' 7-0 victory. Grier stated that he has mostly positive memories about the experience, including the support from teammates and letters from all over the world.

In November 1967, Army's success on the field (then at 7–1) made them a strong candidate to be selected for the 1968 game. However, Pentagon officials, in the midst of the Vietnam War, refused to allow the team to play what would have been the academy's first bowl game ever—citing the "heavy demands on the players' time" as well as an emphasis on football being "not consistent with the academy's basic mission: to produce career Army officers."

Tulane Stadium hosted through December 1974, and it has since been at the  Superdome (except 2006). For the 1972 season, the game was moved to New Year's Eve night; which lasted for four editions, returning to New Year's Day in January 1977. The last time it was played on natural grass was in January 1971.

Compared to most bowl games, the Sugar Bowl has had steady naming rights sponsorship. Its first corporate title sponsor was USF&G Financial Services from 1987 to 1995, then Finnish mobile phone manufacturer Nokia from 1995 to 2006. In March 2006, Allstate Insurance was announced as the new title sponsor, and has continued to sponsor the game since.

ABC Sports televised the game from 1969 through 2006.  Fox Sports televised the game from 2007 to 2010 as part of its contract with the BCS. ESPN started airing the game with the 2010–11 season, after outbidding Fox for the broadcasting rights.

The 2006 game was relocated to the Georgia Dome in Atlanta, Georgia, because of the extensive damage the Superdome suffered as a result of Hurricane Katrina. Big East Champion West Virginia would go on to beat SEC Champion Georgia in the game 38-35. It returned to the refurbished Superdome in 2007. The payout for the 2006 game was $14–17 million per participating team.  According to Sports Illustrated, the 2007 salary for Sugar Bowl CEO Paul Hoolahan was $607,500.

Prior to the BCS, the game traditionally hosted the Southeastern Conference (SEC) champion against a top-tier at-large opponent.  This was formalized in 1975, when the SEC champion was granted an automatic bid to the Sugar Bowl starting with the end of the 1976 season.  This continued throughout the time of the Bowl Coalition, a precursor to the BCS.  However, the Sugar Bowl agreed to release the SEC champion if necessary to force a national championship game.  Under this format, the Sugar Bowl hosted the first Bowl Coalition national championship game, when SEC champion Alabama upended Miami at the end of the 1992 season. When the Bowl Coalition became the Bowl Alliance at the start of the 1995 season, the Sugar Bowl would still release the SEC champion to go to the national championship game if they were ranked in the top two in the nation.

Under the now-defunct BCS format, the Sugar Bowl continued to host the SEC champion against a top-tier at-large opponent, unless the SEC champion went to the BCS National Championship Game.  When this happened, the Sugar Bowl usually selected the highest-ranked SEC team still available in the BCS pool. The SEC champion played for the national championship in every one of the eight final editions of the BCS (2006–2013).

The Sugar Bowl maintains an archive of past programs, images, newsreels, and other materials. The archive, originally housed in the Superdome, survived Hurricane Katrina, but a more secure home was needed. During the summer of 2007, the Sugar Bowl donated its materials to The Historic New Orleans Collection, designating it the permanent home of its archive.

Ohio State vacated its 2011 Sugar Bowl victory over Arkansas in response to NCAA allegations over a memorabilia-for-cash scandal.

The 2012 game, pitting the Michigan Wolverines against the Virginia Tech Hokies, was the first Sugar Bowl since 2000—and only the sixth since World War II—without an SEC team. Both of the SEC's BCS participants, Alabama and LSU, played in the National Championship Game (in the Superdome), and under BCS rules only two teams per conference were eligible for BCS bowls.

In May 2012, the Big 12 and SEC announced plans to create a new bowl game, the "Champions Bowl," that would play host to the champions of those two conferences. That November, it was officially announced that the Champions Bowl had been awarded to New Orleans under a 12-year contract beginning in 2015, and would retain the Sugar Bowl name (stating that "Champions Bowl" was only a working title). In addition, it was announced that the Sugar Bowl would host one of two national semi-final games every three seasons (in the 2014, 2017, 2020, and 2023 seasons) as part of the new College Football Playoff system replacing the BCS.

The game for the 2022 season was moved to December 31, 2022 with a noon ET kickoff; out of respect to the NFL, no bowl games are played on January 1 if it falls on a Sunday, while broadcaster ESPN is also committed to airing Monday Night Football. It was only the sixth edition of the game played on New Year's Eve.

Game results
Rankings are based on the AP Poll prior to the game being played. Italics denote a tie game

Source:

Future games

 denotes game is a College Football Playoff semifinal

Most Outstanding Players (Miller-Digby Award)
The Miller-Digby Award is presented to the Most Outstanding Player (MOP) in the Sugar Bowl, as voted by sports journalists covering the game. The award was initially established in 1948 following the death of Warren V. Miller, the first president of the Bowl; it was renamed the Miller-Digby Memorial Trophy in 1959, to also honor Fred J. Digby, the first general manager and fellow founding member of the Bowl. When the Sugar Bowl acts as a CFP semifinal, both an offensive and defensive MVP are named; this has been the case in 2015, 2018, and 2021.

 Terrelle Pryor was later ruled ineligible and his statistics for the 2010 season, including the 2011 Sugar Bowl, were vacated.

Most appearances
Updated through the December 2022 edition (89 games, 178 total appearances).

Teams with multiple appearances

 December 2022 participant

Teams with a single appearance
Won (8): Boston College, Duke, Fordham, Kentucky, Louisville, Maryland, Navy, Utah

Lost (11): Air Force, Carnegie Tech, Cincinnati, Hawai'i, Illinois, Kansas State, Rice, Saint Mary's (CA), Temple, Virginia, Wyoming

Conference participation
Mississippi State, South Carolina and Vanderbilt are the only current SEC members that have not appeared in the Sugar Bowl. Former members Georgia Tech and Tulane also appeared in the Sugar Bowl while in the SEC, although former member Sewanee did not.
 Iowa State, Kansas, and Texas Tech are the only current or former Big Eight or Big 12 members that have not appeared in the Sugar Bowl.
 Texas Tech, Houston and SMU are the only former Southwest Conference members that have not played in the Sugar Bowl.

Appearances by conference
Updated through the December 2022 edition (89 games, 178 total appearances).

 Games marked with an superscript D were played in December.
 Conferences that are defunct or not currently active in FBS are marked in italics.
 Records reflect each team's conference affiliation at the time the game was played.
 Big Eight records include games when the conference was known as the Big Six or Big Seven.
 The American Athletic Conference (The American) retains the charter of the original Big East, following its 2013 realignment.
 Independent appearances: Air Force (1971), Boston College (1941), Carnegie Tech (1939), Florida State (1989), Fordham (1942), Miami (Florida) (1986, 1990), Navy (1955), Notre Dame (Dec. 1973, 1981, 1992, 2007), Penn State (Dec. 1972, Dec. 1975, 1979, 1983), Pittsburgh (1956, 1977, 1982), Saint Mary's (California) (1946), Santa Clara (1937, 1938), Syracuse (1965, 1988), and Temple (1935).
 Three games have been contested between two SEC teams: 1953, 1960, and 1964.
 The 2010 Ohio State Buckeyes later vacated all victories, including the 2011 Sugar Bowl.
 No team from the Pac-12 or its predecessors (e.g. PCC) has appeared in the Sugar Bowl.

Game records

Source:

Broadcasting

From 1999 to 2006, the game aired on ABC as part of its BCS package, where it had also been televised from 1969 through 1998. The Sugar Bowl was the only Bowl Alliance game to stick with ABC following the 1995, 1996 and 1997 seasons; the Fiesta and Orange Bowls were televised by CBS. Prior to that, NBC aired the game for several years. From 2006 to 2010, Fox broadcast the game, while ESPN picked up the Sugar Bowl after picking up the rest of the BCS beginning in the 2009–10 season. For 2013, ESPN Deportes introduced a Spanish language telecast of the game.

In November 2012, ESPN announced that it had reached a deal to maintain broadcast rights to the Sugar Bowl through 2026. ESPN pays $55 million yearly to broadcast the game beginning in the 2014–15 season under the new contract, which took effect upon the establishment of the College Football Playoff. ESPN made a similar deal to maintain broadcast rights to the Orange Bowl following the discontinuation of the BCS as well.

See also
 List of college bowl games
 Manning Award

References

External links

 

 
College football bowls
Annual sporting events in the United States
College football bowls in Louisiana
Allstate
New Year's Day
Recurring sporting events established in 1935
American football competitions in New Orleans